is a Buddhist priest (in charge of a temple); honorific title of preceptor or high priest (especially in Zen or Pure Land Buddhism). The same kanji are also pronounced kashō as an honorific title of preceptor or high priest in Tendai or Kegon Buddhism and wajō as an honorific title of preceptor or high priest in Shingon, Hossō, Ritsu, or Shin Buddhism.

Etymology
Oshō is the Japanese reading of the Chinese hé shang (和尚), meaning a high-ranking Buddhist monk or highly virtuous Buddhist monk. It is also a respectful designation for Buddhist monks in general and may be used with the suffix -san.

According to the Kōjien Japanese dictionary and the Kanjigen dictionary of Chinese character source meanings, it is originally derived from the Sanskrit upadhyaya, meaning "master" in the sense of "teacher".

The literal meaning is "self-taught Buddhist monk/teacher" The Chinese term "he-shang" is derived from the Sanskrit word upadhyaya or acharya:

The standard English translation of oshō has become priest, it has a somewhat different connotation in Zen:

According to the Kōjien, the two characters making up the word are actually pronounced oshō only in the Zen and Pure Land sects. For example, they are read kashō in the Tendai sect and wajō in the Shingon sect.

History
Oshō became an honorific title for Zen-masters", meaning "harmonious respect":

An example of its use is in Rinzai's teachings:

Sōtō Zen
In Sōtō Zen, to become an oshō, teacher, two more steps are to be taken after dharma transmission, namely ten-e and zuise.

Ten-e means "to turn the robe":

After zuise one becomes an oshō, whereafter one may become the resident priest in one's own temple. Hereby one can gain the highest rank:

To supervise the training of monks, further qualifications are necessary:

Bhagwan Shree Rajneesh
The term became well known in the West when Bhagwan Shree Rajneesh started to call himself Osho.

See also
 Osho (disambiguation)
 Dharma transmission
 Zen ranks and hierarchy

References

Web references

Sources

External links
 Muho Noelke: What does it take to become a full-fledged Soto-shu priest and is it really worth the whole deal? Part 1 - 2 - 3 - 4 - 5 - 6 - 7 - 8 - 9
 The Formation of Soto Zen Priests in the West, A Dialogue

Zen
Japanese Buddhist titles